A Touch of Satin is an album by J. J. Johnson's Quartet which was released on the Columbia label.

Reception

Allmusic awarded the album 3 stars.

Track listing
 "Satin Doll" (Duke Ellington) - 4:28
 "Flat Black"  (J. J. Johnson) - 4:17
 "Gigi" (Frederick Loewe, Alan Jay Lerner) - 3:19
 "Bloozineff" (Johnson) - 3:38
 "Jackie-ing" (Thelonious Monk) - 4:19
 "Goodbye" (Gordon Jenkins) - 2:08
 "Full Moon and Empty Arms" (Buddy Kaye, Ted Mossman) - 4:30
 "Sophisticated Lady" (Ellington, Irving Mills, Mitchell Parish) - 2:33
 "When the Saints Go Marching In" (traditional) - 6:10
Recorded at Columbia 30th Street Studios on  December 15, 1960 (tracks 1-4), December 21, 1960 (tracks 6 & 9) and January 12, 1961 (tracks 5, 7 & 8)

Personnel
J. J. Johnson – trombone
Victor Feldman – piano, vibraphone, celeste
Sam Jones – bass
Louis Hayes – drums

References

J. J. Johnson albums
1962 albums
Albums produced by Teo Macero
Columbia Records albums